The 1935–36 season was Madrid Football Club's 34th season in existence, and their 8th consecutive season in the Primera División. The club also played in the Campeonato Regional Mancomunado (Joint Regional Championship) and the Copa del Presidente de la República (President of the Republic's Cup).

Summary
During the summer, the Spanish Football Federation authorized teams to line-up two foreign players in La Liga matches. The club proceeded to finish second behind champions Athletic Bilbao, despite an excellent offensive performance led by forward Fernando Sañudo.

Meanwhile, in the Spanish Cup Real Madrid defeated Barcelona in the final on 21 June 1936 to win its seventh title, with captain Ricardo Zamora producing a superb performance.

During the autumn of 1936, the Siege of Madrid started a three-year chapter of the Spanish Civil War with attacks between the Republican forces and Nationalist forces. The Chamartín Stadium was occupied by the Republicans, and the club suspended activities, which would be resumed in 1939 after the Nationalist victory in the war.

Squad

Transfers

Competitions

La Liga

League table

Results by round

Matches

Campeonato Regional Mancomunado Centro-Sur

Copa del Presidente de la República

Final

Statistics

Player statistics

Notes

References

Real Madrid CF seasons
Spanish football clubs 1935–36 season